In  Tibetan Buddhist tradition, Shambhala (also spelled Shambala or Shamballa;) is a  spiritual kingdom. Shambhala is mentioned in the Kalachakra Tantra.  The Bon scriptures speak of a closely related land called Tagzig Olmo Lung Ring.

The Sanskrit name is taken from the name of a city mentioned in the Hindu Puranas, probably in reference to Sambhal in Uttar Pradesh. The mythological relevance of the place originates with a prophecy in Vishnu Purana (4.24) according to which Shambhala will be the birthplace of Kalki, the next incarnation of Vishnu, who will usher in a new age (Satya Yuga); and the prophesied ruling Kingdom of Maitreya, the future Buddha.

Kalachakra tantra

Shambhala is ruled by the future Buddha Maitreya. The Shambhala narrative is found in the Kalachakra tantra, a text of the group of the Anuttarayoga Tantras. Kalachakra Buddhism was presumably introduced to Tibet still in the 11th century, the epoch of the Tibetan Kalachakra calendar. The oldest known teachers of Kalachakra are Dolpopa Sherab Gyaltsen (d. 1361) and Buton Rinchen Drub (d. 1364).

In the narrative, King Manjuśrīkīrti is said to have been born in 159 BC and ruled over a kingdom of 300,510 followers of the Mlechha religion, some of whom worshiped the Sun. He is said to have expelled 20,000 people from his domain who clung to Surya Samadhi (solar worship) rather than convert to Kalachakra (Wheel of Time) Buddhism. 
After realizing these were the wisest and best of his people and how much he was in need of them, he later asked them to return and some did. Those who did not return are said to have set up the city of Shambhala. Manjuśrīkīrti initiated the preaching of the Kalachakra teachings in order to try to convert those who returned and were still under his rule. In 59 BC he abdicated his throne to his son, Puṇḍārika, and died soon afterward, entering the Sambhogakaya of Buddhahood.

The Kalachakra tantra prophesies that when the world declines into war and greed, and all is lost, the 25th Kalki king Maitreya will emerge from Shambhala, with a huge army to vanquish Dark Forces and usher in a worldwide Golden Age. This final battle is prophesied for the year 2424 or 2425 (in the 3304th year after the death of Buddha). Thereafter, Buddhism would survive another 1,800 years.

Western reception
Tibet and Tibetan Buddhism  were largely unknown in the West prior to the beginning of the 20th century. The name itself, however, was reported as early as the 17th century, by way of  Estêvão Cacella, the Portuguese missionary who had heard about Shambhala (transcribed as  Xembala), and thought it was another name for Cathay or China.  Cacella in 1627  headed to Tashilhunpo, the seat of the Panchen Lama and, discovering his mistake, returned to India.

The Hungarian scholar Sándor Kőrösi Csoma, writing in 1833, provided the first geographic account of "a fabulous country in the north...situated between 45' and 50' north latitude".

Theosophy
During the late 19th century, Theosophical Society co-founder Helena Blavatsky alluded to the Shambhala myth. Blavatsky, who claimed to be in contact with a Great White Lodge of Himalayan Adepts, mentions Shambhala in several places, but without giving it especially great emphasis.

Later esoteric writers further emphasized and elaborated on the concept of a hidden land inhabited by a hidden mystic brotherhood whose members labor for the good of humanity. Alice A. Bailey claims Shamballa (her spelling) is an extra-dimensional or spiritual reality on the astral plane, a spiritual centre where the governing deity of Earth, Sanat Kumara, dwells as the highest Avatar of the Planetary Logos of Earth, and is said to be an expression of the Will of God.

Expeditions and location hypotheses
Nicholas and Helena Roerich led a 1924–1928 expedition aimed at Shambhala. They also believed that Belukha Mountain in the Altai Mountains was an entrance to Shambhala, a common belief in that region.

Inspired by Theosophical lore and several visiting Mongol lamas, Gleb Bokii, the chief Bolshevik cryptographer and one of the bosses of the Soviet secret police, along with his writer friend Alexander Barchenko, embarked on a quest for Shambhala, in an attempt to merge Kalachakra-tantra and ideas of Communism in the 1920s. Among other things, in a secret laboratory affiliated with the secret police, Bokii and Barchenko experimented with Buddhist spiritual techniques to try to find a key for engineering perfect communist human beings. They contemplated a special expedition to Inner Asia to retrieve the wisdom of Shambhala – the project fell through as a result of intrigues within the Soviet intelligence service, as well as rival efforts of the  Soviet Foreign Commissariat that sent its own expedition to Tibet in 1924.

French Buddhist Alexandra David-Néel associated Shambhala with Balkh in present-day Afghanistan, also offering the Persian Sham-i-Bala, "elevated candle" as an etymology of its name. 
In a similar vein, the Gurdjieffian J. G. Bennett published speculation that Shambalha was Shams-i-Balkh, a Bactrian sun temple.

Hitler sent several expeditions to Tibet in the 1930s "to contact the Agartha and Shambala", supposedly part of Nazi esotericism.

In popular culture 
Shambhala may have been the inspiration for Shangri-La, a paradise on Earth hidden in a Tibetan valley, which features in the 1933 novel Lost Horizon by British author James Hilton.

In 1969, Shambhala Publications, a book publishing company, was founded by Samuel Bercholz and Michael Fagan, in Berkeley, California.

Daniel Moore wrote the song "Shambala" that in 1973 was recorded by both B. W. Stevenson and Three Dog Night.

Shambhala appears as a mini-dungeon in the PC-98 game E.V.O.: The Theory of Evolution. The dungeon is a network of tunnels that act as the entrance to both Atlantis and Mu

Much of the plot of Thomas Pynchon's 2006 novel, Against the Day, revolves around Shambhala, with some characters seeking an actual city by that name, a site of unique and exploitable power, and others treating it as a great figure for the transcendent.

In 2009, the mythical city was depicted in the video game Uncharted 2: Among Thieves. The game follows treasure hunter Nathan Drake in search of the lost city.

Fullmetal Alchemist the Movie: Conqueror of Shamballa mainly takes place in an alternate version of Earth in 1923, specifically Germany. The parallel world that serves as the main setting in the Fullmetal Alchemist series is a secondary setting. Said parallel world is believed to be Shamballa by the movie's villains, a group of Nazis led by Dietlinde Eckhart (based on the historical Dietrich Eckart), who desire to open an inter-dimensional portal between the two worlds so as to harness Shamballa's technology to help Hitler take control of Germany.

Shambala also features in the 1996 Scrooge McDuck comic "The Treasure of the Ten Avatars" by Keno Don Rosa. In this comic, Scrooge McDuck, Donald Duck, and his nephews discover Shambala and try to find its treasures.

In 2012, a trilogy named 'Sambhala' was published by a Bangladeshi writer. 

The 2019 Indian animated film Little Singham Aur Shambhala Jhambhala features a villain named Shambhala who wants to become an Asura.

In Nintendo's 2019 tactical strategy game Fire Emblem: Three Houses, Shambhala exists as an extremely technologically advanced subterranean city of an ancient people called the Agarthans looking to overthrow and reclaim the surface. The player can visit and fight through Shambhala in chapters 20 and 21 in the Silver Snow and Verdant Wind routes, respectively.

In 2021, Canadian Experimental Soundscape artist "MU Simulacra" released a 12 minute track entitled "Shambhala" for his 24 hour acoustic epic Art as an Expression of Rta. The song sonically explores the inward journey of finding Shambhala as a non-spatial destination or dimension. Repetitive tones, melodies and loops that are purposely familiar yet ambiguous are utilized in order to demonstrate the  effect of state of mind on interpretive processes.

In the 2016 movie Doctor Strange by Marvel Studios, 'shamballa' is used as the wifi password at Kamar-Taj, the place where Stephen Strange first learns to do magic.

See also
 Agartha
 Kumari Kandam
 Lost city
 Sagala
 Shambala (disambiguation)
 Shangri-La

Citations

General references 

 Rock opera "Szambalia" ("Shambhala") (2014). Official premiere in Poland, Warsaw (24.06.2014)
 Rock song "Halls of Shambala" by B. W. Stevenson, covered and popularized by the rock band Three Dog Night Shambala (song)
 Berzin, Alexander (2003). Study Buddhism. Mistaken Foreign Myths about Shambhala.
 Martin, Dean. (1999). {"'}}Ol-mo-lung-ring, the Original Holy Place". In: Sacred Spaces and Powerful Places In Tibetan Culture: A Collection of Essays. (1999) Edited by Toni Huber, pp. 125–153. The Library of Tibetan Works and Archives, Dharamsala, H.P., India. .
 Meyer, Karl Ernest and Brysac, Shareen Blair (2006) Tournament of Shadows: The Great Game And the Race for Empire in Central Asia 
 Bernbaum, Edwin. (1980). The Way to Shambhala: A Search for the Mythical Kingdom Beyond the Himalayas. Reprint: (1989) St. Martin's Press, New York. .
 Jeffrey, Jason. Mystery of Shambhala   in New Dawn, No. 72 (May–June 2002).
 Trungpa, Chogyam. Shambhala: The Sacred Path of the Warrior. Shambhala Publications. 
 Znamenski, Andrei. (2011). Red Shambhala: Magic, Prophecy, and Geopolitics in the Heart of Asia. Quest Books, Wheaton, IL (2011) .
 Dr. S. D'Montford. "Tibetan Buddhist Atrocities and Propaganda". Happy Medium Publishing. Sydney. 2004
 Allen, Charles. (1999). The Search for Shangri-La: A Journey into Tibetan History. Little, Brown and Company. Reprint: Abacus, London. 2000. .
 Znamenski, Andrei. Red Shambhala: Magic, Prophecy, and Geopolitics in the Heart of Asia. Wheaton, IL: Quest Books, 2011. 
 Martin, Dan. (1999). Ol-mo-lung-ring, the Original Holy Place". In: Sacred Spaces and Powerful Places In Tibetan Culture: A Collection of Essays. (1999) Edited by Toni Huber, pp. 125–153. The Library of Tibetan Works and Archives, Dharamsala, H.P., India. .
 Symmes, Patrick. (2007).  "The Kingdom of the Lotus" in Outside, 30th Anniversary Special Edition, pp. 148–187. Mariah Media, Inc., Red Oak, Iowa.
 Meurois, Daniel et Anne Givaudan (1987). Le Voyage a Shambhalla. Un pèlerinage vers soi. Ed. Le Passe-Monde.

External links
 

Asia in mythology
Locations in Buddhist mythology
Mythological kingdoms, empires, and countries
Pure lands
Sambhal
Tibetan Buddhism